Air Service Plus was a low cost airline based in Pescara, Abruzzo, Italy. It operated services to destinations in Europe. Flights are currently operated by Axis Airways, a French airline. Its main base is Abruzzo International Airport, Pescara.

History
The airline began operating low-fare flights connecting Pescara to Paris (Charles de Gaulle International Airport) in 2003, then to Brussels (Brussels South Charleroi Airport) in 2004. During 2005, Air Service Plus started new routes from Pescara to Zürich and from Perugia to Paris. As of 2005, Air Service Plus had carried more than 65,000 passengers, making Pescara and the Abruzzo Region well known amongst French and Belgian tourists. It can be considered as an outstanding example of cooperation between Regions and private investors to develop tourism to less famous destinations.

See also
 List of defunct airlines of Italy

References

Italian companies established in 2003
Defunct airlines of Italy
Airlines established in 2003